The Hennepin County Library, which serves Hennepin County, Minnesota, including the city of Minneapolis, consists of 41 branches in 24 cities and towns. Of these, 15 are in Minneapolis; collectively they made up the Minneapolis Public Library until they were absorbed by the Hennepin system in the merger. Four branches (Central, Franklin, Hosmer, and Sumner) were originally founded as Carnegie libraries. Several other libraries, separate from the system, also operate within the county's boundaries.

Many of the branches of the current library system were established by entities other than the system itself. The Minneapolis Public Library was founded in 1885 to serve Minneapolis, the county's largest city. It opened its first two branches in 1890. During the 1890s, many areas of Minnesota, especially rural zones, lacked free libraries. Over the course of the decade a patchwork of private and legislative efforts sought to deal with the dearth. The city of Hopkins established its own independent library system in 1912; in 1913, other Minnesota cities including Wayzata and Robbinsdale were recorded as having library associations or clubs of their own.

Hennepin County established a library service of its own in early 1922, which entailed taking control of some of the smaller cities' branches (including Robbinsdale's) as well as the creation of a bookmobile which was scheduled to run nine routes per month by 1926. In 1934, Minneapolis was awarded a $125,000 endowment from the Carnegie Corporation for four branch buildings. By the mid-1950s, there were 25 branch libraries, and the bookmobile reached 1,300 families.

The Hennepin County Library board was established as a separate entity in 1965 as a building initiative to serve the rest of the county. The two library boards first discussed the idea of a merger in 1967. Due to concerns about properly serving the residents and city of Minneapolis, the merger debate ended in 1974, keeping both groups separate.  In 2007, the merger was revisited and the Minneapolis Public Library officially joined the Hennepin County Library system at the beginning of 2008.

Extant libraries

Former libraries 

Historically, the library operated a bookmobile that started in 1922. In 1955, the bookmobile was serving 1,500–1,600 families and 16 schools, and in 1962 that figure was up to 6,000 families. The library still offers outreach services in the form of mailing or delivering materials to the home of patrons unable to physically access the library system.

The following libraries are no longer operational:
 Crystal Bay (closed in August 1955)
 Dayton (1968–1978)
 Hamel (1922–1968)
 Longfellow (closed in 1968 and replaced by the Nokomis Library)
 Morningside (closed in December 1976)
 North Community Library (the city's first branch library; 1893–1979)
 Seven Corners (1912–1964)
 Stubbs Bay (closed in August 1955)
 Robbinsdale (community now served by the Rockford Road library)

The Hennepin County Library formerly operated school libraries in rural communities and a library in Glen Lake Sanatorium.

Libraries not part of the Hennepin County Library system 
The following libraries are located in Hennepin County, but not part of the Hennepin County Library system: the Hennepin County Law Library, Lindell Library at Augsburg University, Minneapolis Community and Technical College Library (located in Whitney Hall), Minneapolis Institute of Art Museum Library, Normandale Community College Library, Quatrefoil Library, Saint Mary's University of Minnesota Library, North Central University's T.J. Jones Library and the University of Minnesota Libraries.

See also 

 List of Carnegie libraries in Minnesota

References

Citations

Bibliography

External links 

Branches
Lists of buildings and structures in Minnesota
Hennepin
Libraries in Minnesota